Communauté d'agglomération de Blois Agglopolys is an intercommunal structure, centred on the city of Blois. It is located in the Loir-et-Cher department, in the Centre-Val de Loire region, central France. It was created in January 2012. Its seat is in Blois. Its population was 105,635 in 2017, of which 46,086 in Blois proper.

Composition
The communauté d'agglomération consists of the following 43 communes:

Averdon
Blois
Candé-sur-Beuvron
Cellettes
Chailles
Champigny-en-Beauce
La Chapelle-Vendômoise
Chaumont-sur-Loire
La Chaussée-Saint-Victor
Cheverny
Chitenay
Cormeray
Cour-Cheverny
Fossé
Françay
Herbault
Lancôme
Landes-le-Gaulois
Marolles
Menars
Mesland
Monteaux
Monthou-sur-Bièvre
Les Montils
Rilly-sur-Loire
Saint-Bohaire
Saint-Cyr-du-Gault
Saint-Denis-sur-Loire
Saint-Étienne-des-Guérets
Saint-Gervais-la-Forêt
Saint-Lubin-en-Vergonnois
Saint-Sulpice-de-Pommeray
Sambin
Santenay
Seur
Valaire
Valencisse
Valloire-sur-Cisse
Veuzain-sur-Loire
Villebarou
Villefrancœur
Villerbon
Vineuil

References

Blois
Blois